The Parliamentary Standing Committee on External Affairs is a department related standing committee (DRSC) of selected members of parliament, constituted by the Parliament of India, for the purpose of legislative oversight of the foreign policy,  and decision making of the Ministry of External Affairs. It is one of the 24 DRSCs that have been mandated with the task of ministry specific oversight.

As of 2022, The committee currently is headed by MP P. P. Chaudhary.

Current Composition 
Each of the committees have 31 members – 21 from Lok Sabha and 10 from Rajya Sabha.  These members are to be nominated by the Speaker of Lok Sabha or the Chairman of Rajya Sabha respectively. The term of office of these committees does not exceed one year. These committees are serviced either by Lok Sabha secretariat or the Rajya Sabha secretariat, depending on who has appointed the chairman of that committee.

Following are the members of the Parliamentary Standing Committee on Home Affairs.

Lok Sabha members

Rajya Sabha members

Chairpersons

See also 

 17th Lok Sabha
 Estimates Committee
 Committee on Public Undertakings
 Public Accounts Committee (India)
 Standing Committee on Finance

References

External link
 Committee on External Affairs on Lok Sabha Website

Committees of the Parliament of India
Ministry of External Affairs (India)
India